is a Japanese television series which premiered on NTV on October 14, 2008.

Main cast
 Mokomichi Hayami as Kotaro Yamashita, a part-timer publisher and is aspiring to become a mobile phone novelist. He is the younger brother of Hinako, and is the uncle of Anne Sakurai.
 Riko Yoshida as Anne Sakurai, a very popular child actress. She is the secret daughter of Hinako and Kazuo.
 Rosa Kato as Mineko Fuji, the manager of Anne Sakurai.
 Rie Tomosaka as Makiko Yasuno
 Yoshinori Okada as Ken Ishida
 Hitomi Takahashi as Kae Shibuya
 Jingi Irie as Yuta Shibuya
 Mai Shinohara as Mutsumi Shinomiya
 Norihisa Hiranuma as Atsushi Hirakawa
 You as Hinako Ozora
 Arata Furuta as Hirofumi Sugawara
 Takeshi Kaga as Kazuo Ishizaka
 Yoshio Doi as Komiya

Episodes

 All ratings are by Video Research, Ltd..

Theme song
The theme song of Oh! This was announced on September 6, 2008. This song will be sung by Kobukuro as their 16th single.

Home media
In Japan, the DVD version for Oh! My Girl!! was released on 4 March 2009. It comes in a box of 4 DVD (Region 2) discs, and is sold by VAP, Inc.

References

External links
  

Japanese drama television series
2008 Japanese television series debuts
2008 Japanese television series endings